Miriam Manzano-Hammond (born 14 February 1975 in Sydney) is a former Australian competitive figure skater in ladies' singles. She is the 2003 Merano Cup champion, the 2002 Karl Schäfer Memorial silver medalist, the 2003 Finlandia Trophy bronze medalist, and a six-time Australian national champion.

Manzano began skating at age 11, in 1986. Following her retirement from competitive skating, she began working as a coach in Philip, Canberra, Australia.

Programs

Results
GP: Grand Prix

References

External links

1975 births
Australian female single skaters
Living people
Sportswomen from New South Wales
Figure skaters from Sydney
ACT Academy of Sport alumni